Derrick Lonsdale (born April 22, 1924) is an American pediatrician and researcher into the benefits of certain nutrients in preventing disease and psychotic behavior. He is a Fellow of the American College of Nutrition (FACN), and also a Fellow of the American College for Advancement in Medicine (FACAM)

Lonsdale is known for his research into thiamine and his controversial theory that thiamine deficiency is widespread among Americans and predictive of anti-social behavior.

Positions
Lonsdale was a practitioner in pediatrics at the Cleveland Clinic for 20 years. He became Head of the Section of Biochemical Genetics at the Clinic.

In 1982, Lonsdale retired from the Cleveland Clinic and joined the Preventive Medicine Group to specialize in nutrient-based therapy.

He is also on the Scientific Research Advisory Committee of the American College for Advancement in Medicine and is an editor of their Journal.

Research work
Lonsdale hypothesizes that healing comes from the body itself rather than from external medical interventions.

Lonsdale has studied the use of nutrients to prevent diseases. He is particularly interested in Vitamin B1, also known as thiamine.  The World Health Organisation have cited three of Lonsdale's thiamine deficiency papers on Sudden Infant Death Syndrome.

Lonsdale has spoken at orthomolecular medicine conferences.

Autism
Lonsdale led an uncontrolled study on the treatment of autism spectrum children with thiamine.<ref>Treatment of autism spectrum children with thiamine tetrahydrofurfuryl disulfide: A pilot study Derrick Lonsdale, Raymond J. Shamberger 2 & Tapan Audhya</> (2002), Neuroendocrinol Lett, Vol 23:302-308.</ref> He also led a study (uncontrolled) of secretin, which he and Shamberger say led to an improvement in behaviour and bowel control of autistic children in his study. Both of these studies are controversial because they link nutrition with autism.

Analysing the findings in the latter study, autism researchers say that while secretin may have "affect[ed] gastrointestinal function, [which] may have influenced bowel function that in turn limited the discomfort children feel, but this does not constitute a substantial behavioural change".

Child violence
In 2002 Lonsdale caused controversy when he linked child violence (children killing other children) to dietary deficiencies rather than the accepted social causes. Lonsdale put this down to 'high calorie malnutrition' where children overeat high calories foods that lack vital nutrients resulting in an upset to 'brain balance'. He pointed the finger at a range of 'normal' foods as well as generally accepted junk foods.

Books

Lonsdale has written several books, including:
 A Nutritionist's Guide to the Clinical use of Vitamin B-1.
 Why I Left Orthodox Medicine: Healing for the 21st Century
 Free Oxygen Radicals and Disease
 A Nutritional Approach to a Revised Model for Medicine: Is Modern Medicine Helping You?
 Thiamine Deficiency Disease, Dysautonomia, and High Calorie Malnutrition

See also
 Alternative Medicine
 Autism
 Cleveland Clinic
 Thiamine

References 

1924 births
Living people
American health and wellness writers
American nutritionists
American pediatricians
Autism researchers
Orthomolecular medicine advocates
Vitamin researchers